Gökbelen is a village in Silifke district of Mersin Province, Turkey. The population was 171. as of 2010. But in summers the population increases for the village is used as a summer resort by some Silifke and Taşucu residents. (See Yayla) .

References

External links
  Silifke Municipality's website
   Taşucu Municipality's website

Villages in Silifke District